"Ooh La La" is a 1973 song by the band Faces, written by Ronnie Lane and Ronnie Wood. It is the title song of the band's last studio album, Ooh La La.

The lead vocals were provided by Wood, a rarity in the band's catalogue; lead vocals were usually performed by Rod Stewart and less often by Ronnie Lane. Stewart and Lane each recorded lead vocals for the song, but reportedly neither was satisfied by their attempt. Their producer Glyn Johns then suggested that Wood give it a try, and this version was used for the track on the album.

In 2021, it was listed at No. 246 on Rolling Stone's "Top 500 Best Songs of All Time".

Content
The lyrics describe a dialogue between a grandfather and grandson, with the elder man warning the younger about the perils of relationships with women: "Poor old granddad, I laughed at all his words / I thought he was a bitter man; he spoke of women's ways." The chorus laments, "I wish that I knew what I know now, when I was younger."

Personnel
 Ronnie Wood – vocals, acoustic guitar, lead guitar
 Ronnie Lane – bass, rhythm guitar, tambourine
 Ian McLagan – piano, organ, Mellotron
 Kenney Jones – drums, maracas

Releases
In addition to being the closing title track of the Faces' final studio album, the Faces version of the song appeared as a US single in May 1973. The first compilation on which the Faces version appeared was the album Snakes and Ladders / The Best of Faces. It appeared again on the 1999 Faces retrospective Good Boys... When They're Asleep and then also on the 2004 four-disc box set Five Guys Walk into a Bar.... It appeared on the Ronnie Wood greatest hits compilation Ronnie Wood Anthology: The Essential Crossexion, where Wood stated in the liner notes that he always thinks of Lane when he plays it.

Certifications

Ronnie Lane versions
Lane recorded his own version with his new group Slim Chance soon after leaving Faces in 1973; it featured lyrics slightly altered from those he wrote for the Faces version. Although his studio version was never released during his lifetime, it appeared as the title track of the 2014 Slim Chance compilation Ooh La La: An Island Harvest. Lane regularly performed the song at concerts and on radio shows throughout his solo career until he retired from the music business in 1993, due to bad health.

Rod Stewart version

Rod Stewart covered the song on his 1998 solo album When We Were the New Boys in tribute to the recently deceased Lane. It was released in May 1998 as the lead single from the album, and became a top 40 hit in the U.S. and top 20 in the UK.

Charts

Weekly charts

Year-end charts

Release history

Other covers
Indie rock band Silkworm covered the song for their 2000 LP Lifestyle. Banjo player Danny Barnes covered the song on his 2003 release Dirt on the Angel. The song was covered by Counting Crows as a B-side for their 2003 single "If I Could Give All My Love (Richard Manuel Is Dead)" and re-released on their 2012 studio album Underwater Sunshine. In late 2012, punk rocker Tim Armstrong, best known as front man of Rancid, recorded a ska-flavored cover of the song under the moniker Tim Timebomb and Friends. Included in the recording, and featured in the video, were drummer Travis Barker of Blink-182, bassist J Bonner, and keyboardist Kevin Bivona of The Transplants. American indie rock band Manchester Orchestra performed a version of the song in July 2013 for The A.V. Clubs Undercover series. Canadian band Hey Rosetta! recorded a version in 2014. Folk act Redbird included a version on their album Live at the Cafe Carpe.

In popular culture 
"Ooh La La" was featured in the 1998 film Rushmore, played over the film's final shot and closing credits, and was included on the film's 1999 soundtrack album.

References

1973 songs
1998 singles
Faces (band) songs
Rod Stewart songs
Songs written by Ronnie Lane
Song recordings produced by Glyn Johns
Songs written by Ronnie Wood
Warner Records singles